Ace Capital Cricket Club is a first-class cricket club in Sri Lanka. It was originally founded in 1989 as the Seeduwa/Raddoluwa Cricket Club. In 2011, it became the Sri Lanka Ports Authority Cricket Club. The SLPA withdrew sponsorship in October 2020 and the club was renamed Ace Capital ahead of the 2020–21 season. In 2022–23, Ace Capital is playing in the Major League Tournament.

History
Seeduwa Raddoluwa joined the revamped Sri Lankan first-class competition in the 2008–09 season, becoming the 32nd team to take part in the competition. They played in the 2008–09, 2009–10 and 2010–11 seasons.

In 2011–12, under the new name of Sri Lanka Ports Authority Club, captained by Shantha Kalavitigoda, they competed in Tier B of the Premier Trophy. They won three matches, lost one and drew five, and finished fourth out of ten teams. Captained by Shanuka Dissanayake, they again finished fourth in 2012–13 in the group now named Group B, with three wins, three losses and three draws. In the restructured competition in 2013–14 they finished third in Group A, with two wins, two losses and two draws, and progressed to the Super Eight league, where they finished last, with one win, five losses and a draw. Ashan Priyanjan was captain in most matches.

Captained by Mahela Udawatte, and with Malinda Pushpakumara leading the Premier Trophy bowling with 70 wickets at an average of 16.72, they won the Premier Trophy in 2014–15, winning eight out of their 13 matches and losing only once. At the end of the season they had played 44 matches, with 17 wins, 12 losses and 15 draws.

At the end of the 2013–14 season the leading run-scorer is Gayan Maneshan with 1288 runs at an average of 53.66. The leading wicket-taker is Chanaka Komasaru with 76 wickets at 29.39. The highest score is 235 by Ashan Priyanjan against Kurunegala Youth Cricket Club in 2012–13. The best bowling figures are 7 for 58 by Isuru Udana against Sinhalese Sports Club in 2013–14.

Current squad
The following players have represented Ace Capital in 2022–23:
 P. S. Anil
 N. H. Atharagalla
 T. S. Baskaran
 K. G. B. Chandrabose
 S. M. Colombage
 N. H. G. Cooray
 D. L. S. Croospulle
 P. T. M. Dabare
 B. A. D. A. Dilhara
 G. P. S. Disanayaka
 B. O. P. Fernando
 P. C. Hettiwatte
 K. Ishwara
 M. M. Jaleel
 D. K. R. C. Jayatissa
 N. N. Kadam
 W. S. Kumara
 S. N. Liyanage
 Mohammad Irfan
 Mohammad Rizlan
 R. J. K. T. D. Ranatunga
 M. B. C. D. Thilakarathne
 D. Thissakuttige

References

Sri Lankan first-class cricket teams